This is a list of ambassadors of the United States to Kyrgyzstan.

Until 1991 the Kirghiz Soviet Socialist Republic had been a constituent SSR of the Soviet Union. Upon the breakup of the USSR, the Supreme Soviet of Kyrgyzstan declared itself independent of the Soviet Union on August 31, 1991 and renamed itself the Republic of Kyrgyzstan. The United States recognized Kyrgyzstan on December 26, 1991. An embassy was established in the capital, Bishkek, on February 1, 1992, with Edmund McWilliams as Chargé d'Affaires ad interim. Relations between the United States and Kyrgyzstan have been continuous since that time.

The U.S. Embassy in Kyrgyzstan is located in Bishkek.

Ambassadors

See also
Kyrgyzstan – United States relations
Foreign relations of Kyrgyzstan
Ambassadors of the United States

References

United States Department of State: Background notes on Kyrgyzstan

External links
 United States Department of State: Chiefs of Mission for Kyrgyzstan
 United States Department of State: Kyrgyzstan
 United States Embassy in Bishkek

Kyrgyzstan

United States